Ronald Rusnak (born September 8, 1951) is a former American football player.  He grew up in Prince George, Virginia, and played college football at the offensive guard position for the University of North Carolina at Chapel Hill.  He played for the 1971 North Carolina Tar Heels football team that compiled an 11-1 record. He was six feet, two inches tall and weighed 220 pounds while playing at North Carolina.  He was twice selected as an All-Atlantic Coast Conference (ACC) player and was a unanimous first-team selection to the 1972 College Football All-America Team. He also won the 1972 Jacobs Blocking Trophy as the best blocker in the ACC.

References

1951 births
Living people
American football offensive guards
North Carolina Tar Heels football players
All-American college football players
People from Prince George, Virginia
Players of American football from Virginia